St. Mary is an unincorporated community in St. Mary's Township, Hancock County, Illinois, United States.

References

Unincorporated communities in Hancock County, Illinois
Unincorporated communities in Illinois